Audrey Hall (born c. 1948 in Kingston, Jamaica) is a reggae singer.

Biography
Hall began her career singing with Dandy Livingstone in the duo Dandy & Audrey. They recorded the song "Morning Side of the Mountain" in 1969, the success of which led to an album of the same name. They released a second album on the Trojan label, I Need You. Livingstone also produced Hall's early solo recordings for his Downtown label. Hall worked as a backing singer through much of the 1970s and early 1980s alongside her sister Pam, including on Jimmy Cliff's Give The People What They Want, and Peter Tosh's Mama Africa, but she made a comeback as a solo artist in 1986 with "One Dance Won't Do", an answer record to Beres Hammond's "What One Dance Can Do", produced by Donovan Germain, which took her into the UK top 20. This was followed up by "Smile" in 1986, which repeated her UK chart success and gave her her biggest hit, and "The Best Thing For Me". In 1986, she returned to recording duets, with "Heart Made of Stone" and the album Dynamic Duo, recorded with former Paragon Don Evans. She continued to work with Germain, recording for his Germain and Penthouse labels, and released the album Reggae Zones in 2001.

Discography

Albums
Morning Side of the Mountain (1970) Downtown (Dandy & Audrey)
I Need You (197?) (Dandy & Audrey)
Eight Little Notes (1986) Germain
Just You Just Me (1987) Germain
Dynamic Duo Trojan (Audrey Hall & Don Evans)
Collectors Series (1999) Penthouse
Reggae Zones (2001) Super Power

Singles
"I Second That Emotion" (1968) Downtown (Audrey & The Dreamers)
"Love Me Tonight" (1969) Downtown
"Lover's Concerto" (1969) Downtown
"You'll Lose a Good Thing" (1969) Downtown
"One Fine Day" (1969) Downtown (b-side of Dandy's "Games People Play")
"You Don't Care" (1960) Downtown (Dandy with Audrey)
"Morning Side of the Mountain" (1969) Down Town (Dandy & Audrey)
"One Dance Just Won't Do" (1985) Germain (UK #20)
"Smile" (1986) Germain (UK #14)
"The Best Thing For Me" (1985) Germain (UK #93)
"I Want To Know What Love Is" Germain
"Heart Made of Stone" (with Don Evans)
"All I Need to Know" (1991) Penthouse (with Beres Hammond)
"Open Up Your Eyes" (1999)
"Fade Away" (1999) Barry U (with Don Evans)

References

External links
Audrey Hall at Roots Archives
Audrey Hall at discogs.com

Jamaican reggae musicians
Musicians from Kingston, Jamaica
20th-century Jamaican women musicians
Living people
1940s births
Year of birth uncertain
21st-century Jamaican women musicians